Abhimanyu is a 2003 Indian Telugu film, directed by A. Mallikarjun and produced by Ashwini Dutt. The film stars Kalyan Ram, Ramya (in her Telugu debut), Suhasini Mani Ratnam and Pawan Malhotra in lead roles. The film had musical score by Mani Sharma. The film was a remake of Kannada film Abhi (2003), which also starred Ramya.

Plot
Abhimanyu 'Abhi'(Kalyan Ram) is a cool guy who is good at cultural activities. Saira Bhanu's (Ramya) family approaches Abhi's family in search of a rental house. In the beginning, there is hatred between them, but then they start to know each other. As Bhanu is a Muslim and Abhi is a Hindu, Bhanu's father does not agree for this and he eventually comes in search of Bhanu's lover to thrash him. Abhi does not agree with her father's behavior. In college they start to fight with each other. Bhanu comes to stop them and tells that he's her father. Bhanu's father vacates the house and they all leave for Kurnool. Abhi with his friends goes in search of Bhanu in Kurnool. Somehow Abhi manages to talk with bhanu as their family does not know that he was the lover. Abhi and Bhanu hug in front of their family, then they will come to know that those two were lovers. The old lady(Sowcar Janaki) in Bhanu's house advises Abhi to leave the house immediately as the men from that house will be coming from mosque after the prayer. But Abhi asks why should he be scared of them, the old lady tells him that they will try to kill you. Abhi asks why and the old lady says that ask your mother. Abhi goes back to Hyderabad and asks his mother(Suhasini Mani Ratnam) about that matter what that old lady told. Abhi's mother tells him a flashback story about his real parents who has done interreligious marriage against their parents will and his mom's father and brother now Bhanu's father assassinates them for their families honour. She reveals that she was not his real mother and she adopted him after knowing this situation through his brother who is an investigation officer of that case and since she was physically handicapped and was not able to get married and become a mother. At the same time Bhanu hears the same story from her grandma and she got to know that her grandfather and father has been arrested and punished of sentence of life in the jail later her grandfather was dead in the jail later her father has completed his sentence and became vigorous orthodox Musilim. After some days Bhanu decides to give up her love for her family's sake and she leaves Karnool and goes to Hyderabad to tell this to him. He also agrees with her. But Bhanu's father thinks that she ran away to marry Abhi and he tries to kill him. Then there will be fight between Abhi and Bhanu's father. The old lady advises Bhanu's father to stop his cruelty. He realizes his mistake and allows Bhanu to marry Abhi.

Cast
Kalyan Ram as Abhimanyu 
Ramya as Sairabanu 
Suhasini Mani Ratnam as Janaki 
Pawan Malhotra as Jaleel Khan 
Ali as Ali Bhanu's Maternal Uncle. 
Venu Madhav as Venu Abhi's friend. 
Telangana Shakuntala as Savitri Janaki's personal maid.
Banerjee
Raghunatha Reddy
Sowcar Janaki as Bhanu's Grandmother

Soundtrack
The music was composed by Mani Sharma and released by Aditya Music. All songs were penned by Chandrabose.

References

External links
 

2003 films
2000s Telugu-language films
Telugu remakes of Kannada films
Indian interfaith romance films
Indian romantic drama films
Films scored by Mani Sharma